Burnsides may refer to:

 Sideburns, a style of facial hair
 Burnsides, West Virginia, an unincorporated community in the United States

See also
 Burnside (disambiguation)